Josef Šusta can refer to multiple people

Europe
 Josef Šusta (aquaculturist) - 19th century Czech aquaculturist
 Josef Šusta (racing driver) - European Rallycross Championship race car driver